Saki Niizoe (born 4 July 1996) is a Japanese judoka. She won one of the bronze medals in the women's 70kg event at the 2022 World Judo Championships held in Tashkent, Uzbekistan. She won the gold medal in the women's 70kg event at the 2018 Asian Games held in Jakarta, Indonesia.

In 2017, she won two medals at the Summer Universiade held in Taipei, Taiwan. In the same year, she won the gold medal in the mixed team event at the 2017 World Judo Championships held in Budapest, Hungary. She also won the gold medal in the mixed team event at the 2021 World Judo Championships, also held in Budapest, Hungary.

She won the silver medal in her event at the 2022 Judo Grand Slam Paris held in Paris, France. She won one of the bronze medals in the women's 70kg event at the 2022 World Judo Championships held in Tashkent, Uzbekistan.

References

External links
 

Living people
1996 births
Place of birth missing (living people)
Japanese female judoka
Judoka at the 2018 Asian Games
Asian Games gold medalists for Japan
Asian Games medalists in judo
Medalists at the 2018 Asian Games
Universiade medalists in judo
Universiade gold medalists for Japan
Universiade silver medalists for Japan
Medalists at the 2017 Summer Universiade
21st-century Japanese women